The Council of Ministers or Federal Executive is the executive body of the federal government of Nepal. The prime minister is the head of the council of ministers. The incumbent prime minister is Pushpa Kamal Dahal.

Formation
According to the Constitution of Nepal, the Prime Minister is appointed by the President of Nepal. The President on the recommendation of the Prime Minister of Nepal forms a council of ministers consisting of members not exceeding twenty five in number from among the members of the federal parliament on the basis of the principle of inclusion.

Removal
According to the Constitution of Nepal, the minister ceases to hold office by:

 tendering resignation in writing to the Prime Minister,
 removal by the Prime Minister,
 vacancy in the office of Prime Minister, or,
 death.

Current Council of Ministers

Current Cabinet: Third Dahal cabinet Date of Formation: 26 December 2022''

Notes

References

External links 
 Official website

Lists of Nepalese politicians
Government of Nepal
Cabinet of Nepal